Gardenstown is a small coastal village,  by road east of Banff in Aberdeenshire, northeastern Scotland. 

The village's main economic base is fishing. Gardenstown is served by Gardenstown New Church. The hamlet of Dubford is to the south, and a footpath along the shore to the east leads to the village of Crovie.

History
There is evidence of Neolithic or Bronze Age peoples having settled in the vicinity of Gardenstown; notably at Longman Hill and Cairn Lee. Nearby are the remains of the Church of St John the Evangelist which was built in 1513, and celebrates the defeat of the Danes at this site in 1004 in the Battle of the Bloody Pits.

Gardenstown and its harbour were founded in 1720 by Alexander Garden. Fishing began in 1812. Two substantial stone-built piers enclosing a triangular basin were reconstructed in 1868. A four-storey rubble net store stands nearby.

A church was built in 1830, the work of William Robertson, replacing the old church of St John, and the parish of Gardenstown was separated from Gamrie on 16 March 1885. In 1953, heavy flooding washed away two houses in the village.

Greenskairs House dates to 1846, the work of A & W Reid.

In May 2007, a TV series titled The Baron was filmed in and around the village. The series featured three celebrities — Malcolm McLaren, Mike Reid and Suzanne Shaw — competing to be elected "Baron of Troup". During the filming, McLaren was thrown out of the village for unruly behaviour, leaving Reid and Shaw to contest the final election, which was won by Reid.

Between 2008 and 2010, an ethnographic study of the social, religious and economic life of the village was conducted by anthropologist Joseph Webster. This was published by Palgrave in 2013 as a book entitled The Anthropology of Protestantism: Faith and Crisis among Scottish Fishermen.

In January and February 2008, the village again made headlines when Aberdeenshire Council refused funding to restore the road which runs along the seafront and is a key part of the village's sea defences. The refusal was based upon the status of the road as a private road, thus not the responsibility of the council. This has been seen as controversial since the road runs along the top of the seawall, and the council is responsible for the wall. Residents expressed grave concern that their houses might be washed away and appealed.

Landmarks and local economy
The village's main economic base is fishing. A permanent meteorological station is situated at Gardenstown. The village is served by Gardenstown New Church and has a pub, an osteopathy clinic and a whale and dolphin rescue centre. Until recently there was a bakery and a butcher's shop.

Notable people
Joseph Watt, recipient of the Victoria Cross

See also
 B9031 Road

References

External links

The local tourist board
Gardenstown webcam and local pictures
Cetacean Research & Rescue Unit
Garden Arms Hotel
Gamrie Osteopathy Clinic
Gardenstown weather station
Pictures of Gardenstown
 Joseph Webster - Protestants and Prawns Enchantment and 'The Word' in a Scottish Fishing Village (PhD in Social Anthropology University of Edinburgh 2011)

Villages in Aberdeenshire